Ulrich Wild is an American record producer, engineer and mixer specializing in the rock and metal genres. Born and raised in Switzerland, Ulrich is now a naturalized citizen in the United States, living in Los Angeles, California. In a career that has spanned over 20 years, his numerous credits include producing or engineering albums for bands such as Dethklok (a virtual metal band), Sex Slaves, Project 86, Pantera, Here Comes the Kraken, Static-X, Otep, Stabbing Westward, Powerman 5000, Deftones, Seether, Bleeding Through, Breaking Benjamin, Taproot, SOiL, World Entertainment War, and many other artists, and for soundtracks including Freddy vs. Jason, Mission: Impossible 2, and House of Wax. He has also remixed songs by the band Mindless Self Indulgence.  He was nominated for a Grammy for best engineered non-classical album  in 1995 for his work with White Zombie.

List of produced albums

1990s
1992: Alice in Chains - Dirt (engineered)
1993: Fishbone – Give a Monkey a Brain and He'll Swear He's the Center of the Universe (engineered)
1993: Snoop Dogg – Doggystyle (engineered)
1993: Gary Glitter – I'm the Leader of the Gang (I Am) (Green Jellÿ cover)
1993: Sting – Demolition Man (album) (mixed)
1994: Green Jellÿ – 333 (engineered)
1994: White Zombie – Airheads (song: Feed the Gods)
1994: Therapy? – Nativity in Black (song: Iron Man)
1994: White Zombie – Nativity in Black (song: Children of the Grave)
1995: Deftones – Adrenaline (engineered)
1995: White Zombie – Astro Creep: 2000 (engineered)
1996: White Zombie – Beavis and Butt-head Do America (song: Ratfinks, Suicide Tanks and Cannibal Girls)
1996: Pantera – The Great Southern Trendkill (engineered)
1996: Prong – Rude Awakening (engineered)
1997: Fu Manchu – The Action Is Go
1997: Handsome – Handsome (engineered)
1997: Deftones – Around the Fur (mixed)
1997: Janes Addiction – Kettle Whistle (song: So What!)
1997: Incubus – S.C.I.E.N.C.E. (engineered)
1998: Strung Out – Crossroads & Illusions
1998: Grinspoon – Pushing Buttons (tracks #1 & 2)
1998: Grinspoon – Guide to Better Living
1998: Stabbing Westward – Darkest Days
1998: Strung Out – Twisted by Design
1999: Buckcherry – Buckcherry (engineered)
1999: Sunk Loto – Society Anxiety (mixed)
1999: Powerman 5000 – Tonight the Stars Revolt!
1999: Slipknot – Slipknot (song: Wait and Bleed)
1999: Static-X – Wisconsin Death Trip
1999: Staind – Dysfunction (mixed)

2000s
2000: P.O.D. – Ready to Rumble (Song: freestyle [Remix])
2000: Testeagles – Non Comprehendus (mixed)
2000: Apartment 26 – Hallucinating
2000: The Union Underground – ...An Education in Rebellion
2000: Deftones – White Pony (additional engineering)
2000: Taproot – Gift
2001: Halfcocked – The Last Star
2001: Static-X – Machine
2001: Skrape – New Killer America
2002: Grinspoon – New Detention
2002: Breaking Benjamin – Saturate
2003: Stone Temple Pilots – Thank You (song: All in the Suit that you wear)
2003: Static-X – Shadow Zone (mixed)
2003: Limp Bizkit – Results May Vary (engineered)
2003: Bleeding Through – This Is Love, This Is Murderous
2004: 28 Days – Extremist Makeover
2005: Static-X – Start a War
2005: Stutterfly – And We Are Bled of Color
2006: SOiL – True Self
2006: Wicked Wisdom – Wicked Wisdom
2006: Mindless Self Indulgence – Shut Me Up (remix)
2007: Onesidezero – Onesidezero
2007: Project 86 – The Kane Mutiny EP
2007: Project 86 – Rival Factions
2007: Dethklok – The Dethalbum
2008: Showbread – Nervosa
2008: Mindless Self Indulgence – Never Wanted to Dance (remix)
2009: Dethklok – Dethalbum II
2009: SOiL – Picture Perfect
2009: Skank – Confessions Of A Failure (mixed)
2009: Otep – Smash the Control Machine
2009: Kordz – Beauty And The East
2009: Project 86 – Picket Fence Cartel
2009: Cynergy 67 – Project: Assimilation
2009: That Noise! – Derivatives (mixed)

2010s
2010: CellOut – Superstar Prototype (mixed)
2010: M.A.N. – Massive Audio Nerve (mixed)
2010: Doyle – And Gods Will... (mixed)
2010: Children 18:3 – Rain's a Comin' (mixed)
2011: Otep – Atavist
2011: Tony MacAlpine – Tony MacAlpine (mixed)
2011: Evolution – Evolution (record, engineer and mix for the Otep Shamaya performance on the song "Change")
2011: Dangerous! – Teenage Rampage
2011 Thousand Foot Krutch – Live at the Masquerade (mixed)
2011: L.U.S.T. – First Tattoo (mixed)
2012: Brendon Small – Brendon Small's Galaktikon
2012: Sex Slaves – Call of the Wild
2012: Emilie Autumn – Fight Like A Girl
2012: Stolen Babies – Naught
2012: Dethklok – Dethalbum III
2013: Otep – Hydra
2013: Precious Child – Bloody Knees
2013: Dethklok - The Doomstar Requiem
2013: SOiL - Whole
2014: (hed) p.e. - Evolution
2014: Romantic Rebel - Romantic Rebel
2017: Brendon Small – Brendon Small's Galaktikon II
2018: Aboleth – Benthos

2020s
Static-X - "Project: Regeneration Vol.1"

References

External links
Discography
Artist Interview:  Ulrich Wild – Mixing METAL in the Box By Marsha Vdovin
Ulrich Wild video interview

American people of Swiss descent
American record producers
White Zombie (band)
Living people
American audio engineers
1969 births
Epitaph Records artists
Warner Records artists
Tooth & Nail Records artists